Pavel Kotov (born 22 March 1998) is a Russian slalom canoeist who has competed at the international level since 2015.

He won a bronze medal in the C1 team event at the 2019 ICF Canoe Slalom World Championships in La Seu d'Urgell.

References

External links

Living people
Russian male canoeists
1998 births
Medalists at the ICF Canoe Slalom World Championships